STP is an American brand of automotive aftermarket products, especially lubricants such as motor oil and motor oil additives. The name began as an abbreviation of Scientifically Treated Petroleum. The brand has been owned by Energizer Holdings since November 2018.

History
Chemical Compounds was founded in 1953 by three businessmen, Charles Dwight (Doc) Liggett, Jim Hill and Robert De Hart, with $3,000 in start-up capital in Saint Joseph, Missouri. Their sole product was STP Oil Treatment; the name was derived from “Scientifically Treated Petroleum”. In 1961, the company was acquired by the Studebaker-Packard Corporation.

Studebaker briefly tied STP into its advertising as an abbreviation for “Studebaker Tested Products”. However, Studebaker-Packard CEO Sherwood Egbert felt that STP could one day outpace its parent company and recruited Andy Granatelli as the CEO of STP to help raise the product’s image. At the same time, Granatelli became the public face of STP, often wearing a white suit emblazoned with the red oval STP logo to races, distributing thousands of all-weather STP stickers. Granatelli ran two Novi specials at the 1964 Indianapolis 500. Jim Hurtubise and Bobby Unser were the drivers. There was a film made of the race centering on the Novis.

When Studebaker abandoned auto manufacturing in 1966 to become Studebaker-Worthington, STP sales continued to climb to the point where it was spun off into a publicly traded company in 1969. In 1976, it was acquired by Esmark which itself was purchased by Beatrice Foods in 1984. Beatrice sold STP to Union Carbide the next year. In 1986, Union Carbide's auto products, which included Prestone and Simoniz, were subject to a leveraged buyout. The resulting company, First Brands, was purchased by Clorox in 1998.

In the fall of 2006, STP fuel additives began being used in Marathon gasolines, likely to compete with Chevron's Techron additive.

In 2010, Clorox sold Armor All and STP to Avista Capital Partners. It named the business Armored AutoGroup. In April 2015, the Armored AutoGroup was acquired by Spectrum Brands. Energizer bought the Spectrum's auto care brands (including Armor All, A/C Pro and STP) for $1.25 billion in cash and stock.

Legal issues
In 1976, STP faced a consumer protection order that required it to have scientific backing for certain statements and prohibited making false claims. In 1978, it paid a $500,000 civil penalty over claims. In 1995, STP paid $888,000 to settle Federal Trade Commission charges of false advertising.

Oil treatment
STP Oil Treatment contains zinc dithiophosphate as an anti-wear additive.

Involvement in motor racing and sponsorships

In 1970, STP CEO Andy Granatelli founded the STP Formula One Team. Mario Andretti was hired to drive. The team competed in a total of five races running a March Engineering chassis, their best result being a third place at the 1970 Spanish Grand Prix. In 1972 Granatelli agreed to sponsor NASCAR champion Richard Petty, but their deal almost fell apart before their first race. Granatelli insisted the car be STP day-glo red. Petty held out for his iconic Petty blue, and neither would budge. The resulting two-tone red and blue scheme became more famous than either color alone.

STP sponsored Petty through the end of his driving career in 1992, then Bobby Hamilton, and John Andretti in Petty Enterprises' famous #43. That partnership ended shortly after its acquisition by Clorox. STP and the Petty family hold the second-longest relationship in automobile racing history (1972–2000) (Kenny Bernstein and his son Brandon were sponsored by Budweiser for two years longer (1979–2009)).

In August 2012, STP announced that it would be the title sponsor of the World of Outlaws Sprint Car Series in 2013.

On February 21, 2013, STP announced a return to NASCAR Sprint Cup Series sponsorship in a multi-year deal for the STP Gas Booster 500 starting April 7, 2013 at Martinsville Speedway along with a return as primary sponsor of the Richard Petty Motorsports No. 43 for the 2013 STP Gas Booster 500. STP also sponsored the Xfinity Series race STP 300 from 2011 to 2013 at Chicagoland Speedway.

References

External links
 

Oil companies of the United States
Automotive companies of the United States
Chemical companies of the United States
Companies based in Missouri
Energizer Holdings
American companies established in 1953
Energy companies established in 1953
Non-renewable resource companies established in 1953
Motor oils
Richard Petty
St. Joseph, Missouri